Attorney General Baker may refer to:

Blake Baker, Attorney General of North Carolina
John Baker (died 1558) (1488–1558), Attorney General for England and Wales
Orville D. Baker (1847–1908), Attorney General of Maine
Richard Chaffey Baker (1842–1911), Attorney-General of South Australia
Thurbert Baker (born 1952), Attorney General of Georgia